Bertram's weaver (Ploceus bertrandi), sometimes called Bertrand's weaver, is a species of bird in the family Ploceidae. It is found in Malawi, Mozambique, Tanzania, and Zambia.

It is named after Bertram Lutley Sclater, the son of ornithologist Philip Lutley Sclater, who was a police commissioner in Malawi when Alexander Whyte discovered this species.

References

External links

 Bertram's weaver -  Species text in Weaver Watch.

Bertram's weaver
Birds of East Africa
Bertram's weaver
Taxonomy articles created by Polbot